Qinhuai can refer to:

Qinhuai River, a river in Jiangsu, China, which runs through the city of Nanjing
Qinhuai District, an urban district in Nanjing, China, named after the river